Triple M Riverina MIA 963 (ACMA call sign: 2RG) is an Australian radio station in New South Wales. Owned and operated as part of Southern Cross Austereo's Triple M network, it broadcasts a classic hits format to Griffith, New South Wales and surrounding areas. The station launched on 14 September 1936, and marked only the second commercial radio station to launch in the Riverina. The station was formerly operated by DMG Regional Radio, Macquarie Regional RadioWorks and Southern Cross Media Group - and broadcasts from studios in Griffith alongside sister station hit99.7 Riverina MIA.

After first being announced in September 2016, 2RG was rebranded Triple M 963AM on 15 December 2016 as a result of a nationwide rebrand of Southern Cross Austereo's radio stations.

References

Radio stations in New South Wales
Radio stations established in 1936
Classic hits radio stations in Australia
1936 establishments in Australia